The Downie Hills are a small range of hills in Angus, Scotland, approximately  to the North of Carnoustie. At their highest point is the summit of Camustane Hill, where lies the Panmure Testimonial. To the east of this is a tree-lined avenue that leads via the Camus Cross to the former site of Panmure House.

References

Mountains and hills of Angus, Scotland